Sonesta International Hotels Corporation is an American hotel company founded in 1937, and based in Newton, Massachusetts. Sonesta's largest hotels are in Los Angeles, Houston, Chicago and New Orleans. Its brands include Royal Sonesta, Sonesta, Sonesta Select, Sonesta Simply Suites, Sonesta ES Suites, Sonesta Posada del Inca, Sonesta Cruise Collection, America's Best Value Inn, Canada's Best Value Inn, GuestHouse Extended Stay, Hotel RL, Knights Inn, Red Lion Hotels and Signature Inn.

History
In 1937, real estate mogul A.M. "Sonny" Sonnabend pooled his resources with six other investors to purchase the Preston Beach Hotel in Massachusetts. Sonnabend personally managed the hotel, and began focusing on the hospitality industry. Over the following years, Sonnabend invested in other hotel properties, which he managed through Sonnabend Operated Hotels in 1944.

He purchased a series of properties in Florida, including the Palm Beach Biltmore and the Palm Beach Country Club, from oil magnate Henry Latham Doherty in 1944. Around the same time, he also purchased a series of hotels in Cleveland, Ohio from Robert R. Young, including the Terminal Tower and Hotel Cleveland. Sonnabend Operated Hotels expanded west in 1948, when Sonnabend purchased the Edgewater Beach Hotel in Chicago. In 1953, he purchased the Plaza Hotel in Manhattan from hotelier Conrad Hilton for a reported $15 million.

In 1956, Sonnabend merged Sonnabend Operated Hotels with Childs Company, forming the Hotel Corporation of America. The company purchased the Mayflower Hotel in Washington, D.C. that year. The first Charterhouse Hotel was opened in Bangor, Maine in 1957. Twenty-five other Charterhouse Hotels were built between 1957 and 1983. Beginning in the late 1950s, the name "Sonesta" became affiliated with hotels in the US and abroad. In 1968, the corporation began to grow internationally with the construction of the Sonesta Montreal. In 1969, the first Royal Sonesta Hotel was built in New Orleans.

In 1970, the Hotel Corporation of America was rebranded as Sonesta International Hotels. The name "Sonesta" was a portmanteau of A.M. Sonnabend's nickname "Sonny" and his wife Esther's name. The company introduced "Just Us Kids", a children's club program, in 1975. The Sonesta Art Collection, formed in 1976, was one of the first corporate hotel programs to showcase original art. As of 2012, the collection included over 7,000 works of original art.

Throughout the 1980s and 1990s, Sonesta built several hotel properties in Egypt, and began operating Nile cruises. In the 1990s and 2000s, the company opened several new hotels in South America and the Caribbean.

Expansion, acquisition of Red Lion Hotels Corporation 
Sonesta was sold to an affiliate of Newton-based Hospitality Properties Trust in 2011, and became a privately owned company again. 34% of Sonesta International Hotels Corporation is owned by Service Properties Trust (SVC), a Boston real estate trust. In 2015, Carlos Flores became CEO of Sonesta. In 2015, the company created Sonesta ES Suites, in cities like Columbus, Ohio, Cincinnati, and Cleveland.

In 2020, Sonesta became one of fastest growing hospitality companies in the United States. It had 80 hotels in early 2020. From September 2020 to March 2021, Service Properties Trust transferred over 200 hotels from Marriott Hotels & Resorts and IHG Hotels & Resorts to Sonesta brands, after the previous managers were negatively impacted by the COVID-19 pandemic.

In March 2021, Sonesta finalized its acquisition of Red Lion Hotels Corporation with over 900 hotels in a transaction valued at $90 million. During this time, Sonesta launched Sonesta Simply Suites and Sonesta Select.

In September 2021, Sonesta announced that it would be offering hotel franchising in the United States under Sonesta Franchising. As of 2021, the company had over 1,200 properties, in countries which include Sint Maarten, Peru, Chile, Colombia, Ecuador and Egypt.

Brands

Sonesta International Hotels Corporation 
 The Royal Sonesta
 Sonesta Hotels & Resorts
 Sonesta Select
 Sonesta Essential 
 Sonesta ES Suites
 Sonesta Simply Suites
 Sonesta Posadas del Inca
 Sonesta Cruise Collection
 The James, A Sonesta Experience

Red Lion Hotels Corporation 
 Hotel RL
 Red Lion Hotels & Resorts
 Red Lion Inn & Suites
 Signature Inn
 GuestHouse
 America's Best Value Inn
 Canada's Best Value Inn
 Knights Inn

Loyalty program 
Sonesta Travel Pass is Sonesta's loyalty program. Members of the program earn reward points, privileges and offers.

See also 

 The Clift Royal Sonesta Hotel
 The Chase Park Plaza Hotel
 Roger Sonnabend
 Red Lion Hotels Corporation

References

External links

Official site

Hotel chains in the United States
Companies based in Middlesex County, Massachusetts
Newton, Massachusetts